The 2003 Nigerian Senate election in Nasarawa State was held on April 12, 2003, to elect members of the Nigerian Senate to represent Nasarawa State. John Danboyi representing Nasarawa North, Abubakar Sodangi representing Nasarawa West and Emmanuel Okpede representing Nasarawa South all won on the platform of the Peoples Democratic Party.

Overview

Summary

Results

Nasarawa North 
The election was won by John Danboyi of the Peoples Democratic Party.

Nasarawa West 
The election was won by Abubakar Sodangi of the Peoples Democratic Party.

Nasarawa South 
The election was won by Emmanuel Okpede of the Peoples Democratic Party.

References 

April 2003 events in Nigeria
Nasarawa State Senate elections
Nas